St Thomas Aquinas Church is a Roman Catholic church building located in Springwood, New South Wales, Australia. The church shares its grounds with the St Thomas Aquinas Primary School.

History 
Whilst no physical building stood then, the Catholic Church at Springwood dates back to 1839, when it was part of the Penrith parish. At this time, Mass was offered by Fr. Charles Sumner at the Springwood Inn owned by Thomas Boland, and later offered at the Boland family home. During the period from 1890 to 1907 the church became a part of the Blue Mountains parish, under the parish priest Fr. James McGough. In 1892 the church was given a building of its own thanks to donations of land and money by the Boland family. This was the first church of St Thomas Aquinas (Springwood), and was located at what is now Rest Park, on Macquarie Rd.

The church later relocated to Hawkesbury Rd, to what is now the site of a retirement villa, Aquinas Court.  In 1920 a primary school was opened in the old church building. In November 1981 the first stage of the new St Thomas Aquinas Primary School opened at its current site within the St Columba's grounds, Hawkesbury Rd. In 1986 the church relocated again, this time to the former seminary, and current co-educational high school of St Columba.

In February 1996, the current St Thomas Aquinas Catholic Church opened within the grounds of the St Thomas Aquinas Primary School, on Hawkesbury Rd, Springwood.

Priests past and present 
Fr. Charles Sumner
Fr. James McGough
Fr. James Sheridan
Fr. P. C. Cregan
Fr. Daniel Galvin (first resident priest)
Fr. Thomas Leen
Fr. Canavan
Fr. Leslie Bagot 
Fr. James O'Meara 
Fr. Michael McGloin 
Fr. Renato Paras
Fr. Peter Connelly 
Fr. Alan Layt
Fr. Edward Tyler
Fr. Paul Slyney

St Thomas Aquinas Primary School 
In December 2006, St Thomas Aquinas Primary School (Springwood) celebrated its 85th anniversary with the unveiling of the old school bell following its relocation, a dress-up for the students, a barbecue, and a bushdance.

The school originally opened on the corner of Macquarie Rd and Hawkesbury Rd in 1921 with 24 students. The school consisted of one building, the old church. At the time the school was staffed by Sisters Kevin and Catherine, and continued to be staffed by the Sisters of St Joseph until the late 1970s - early 1980s.
In September 1939 a new school building was opened in the same location by Monsignor Phelan.
In June 1962, with an enrolment of 187 students, another school building was opened by Cardinal Gilroy.
In 1969 a second storey was added to the 1939 building.
In 1981–82 the school relocated to its current site on Hawkesbury Rd.

The school serves the communities of Springwood, Faulconbridge, Hawkesbury Heights, Valley Heights, Warrimoo, Winmalee, and Yellow Rock.

The schools motto is: Love One Another. The school is currently principaled by Marina Hardy.

References

http://www.stachurchspringwood.org.au

 http://www.bluemts.com.au/HistoricalSociety/history.htm
 http://www.parra.catholic.edu.au/Default.aspx?target=%2FOUR+SCHOOLS%2FSchool+Profiles%2FSchool+Profiles.htm&id=StThomas
 https://web.archive.org/web/20050905171807/http://www.parra.catholic.org.au/parlist3.htm (accessed 9 April 2007)

Roman Catholic churches in New South Wales
Roman Catholic churches in Sydney
Buildings and structures in the Blue Mountains (New South Wales)
20th-century Roman Catholic church buildings in Australia